Bronze is an alloy of copper with any of several other metals, often tin.

Bronze may also refer to:

 Bronze (color), the tint of the metal
 Bronze (horse), a racehorse
 Bronze (racial classification), persons of combined Latin European and Indigenous American ancestry
 Bronze (turkey), a breed of domestic turkey
 Bronze Age, an early period of historical development
 Bronze Night, a series of riots in Estonia in 2007
 Bronze Records, an English independent record label 
 Bronze sculpture, a piece of art made of bronze
 Bronze Soldier of Tallinn, a controversial Soviet WW2 Monument in Tallinn, Estonia
 Bronze Sunbird, a species of bird found in Africa
 In chemistry, various mixed oxides with metallic sheen, such as 
 Sodium tungsten bronze 
 Molybdenum purple bronze , A = Li, Na, K, Rb, Tl
 Lucy Bronze (born 1991), English association footballer
 The Bronze (film), a 2015 comedy film
 The Bronze, a fictional nightclub in Buffy the Vampire Slayer

See also
 Bronze Cross (disambiguation)
 Bronze Medal (disambiguation)
 Bronze Medallion (disambiguation), an award in several organizations
 Bronze star (disambiguation)
 Bronz, a musical group
 Bronzer, a tanning product
 Bronzing, a process by which an object is preserved by electroplating with copper
 Compact disc bronzing